Fiona Leggate (born 28 May 1980) is a British auto racing driver.

Early career
Leggate had been interested in motorsport since her childhood, influenced by her father Malcolm Leggate who had a 19-year career in saloon car racing.

After competing in showjumping and dressage events (once breaking both her wrists at once when she was 10) she switched her attention from horseriding to horsepower, entering and winning a competition to drive with ex-British Rally Champion Gwyndaf Evans.

This led to her spending 2003 and 2004 contesting various championships including Britcar and the MG XPower trophy, and in July 2004 she set a world record for the most races contested in one day.

British Touring Car Championship (BTCC)
Leggate entered the BTCC in 2005, joining halfway through the season in a Vauxhall Astra Coupé acquired from the championship-winning works team 888, but converted to run on bioethanol fuel and run by the Leamington Spa based Tech-Speed team. She scored 12 points including a 5th place at Silverstone, gaining much publicity for the environmentally-friendly fuel.

For 2006 Leggate once again raced in the BTCC in the same car running on bio-ethanol, with new sponsorship from Vauxhall dealer Thurlby Motors as well as continuing support from the Energy Efficient Motorsport (EEMS) scheme. Her best results were a trio of 10th places. She missed the races at round 6 due to a cracked engine cylinder. After also missing round 8, she withdrew from the series, her replacement being Paul O'Neill for the remaining two rounds of the series.

In 2007, she again raced in the BTCC with the Kartworld team using an ex-WSR MG ZS fuelled once again with bio-ethanol. She also raced in the EERC Production S1 championship with the same MG ZR that she used in 2006.

Other racing
In 2006 Leggate competed in non-clashing Britcar Production S1 races in an MG ZR. She was partnered once by MG racer Paul White in March at Silverstone and then Rob Oldaker in June at Brands Hatch. Leggate and Oldaker were then joined by MG Trophy racer Ben Jacques and Italian BMW racer Umberto Nacamuli for the Silverstone 24-hour race. The car retired with engine failure with only just over an hour to go. She also competed in the Mini Challenge, driving at Thruxton and Spa, although she missed race two there due to failure of the engine electronics.

As well as this she also raced another MG ZR in two endurance races at the MGCC Silverstone meeting in June. She was partnered in Race 1 by Regular driver Rob Oldaker and by Mark Stacey for the second race. The car retired from the second race with head gasket failure.

In 2007 Leggate entered the PS1 Championship, where she won her class in the first four races, as well as having the class pole at the two meetings and fastest lap.

Personal life
She was previously married to Danny Watts. They have one son.

Racing record

Complete British Touring Car Championship results
(key) (Races in bold indicate pole position – 1 point awarded just in first race) (Races in italics indicate fastest lap – 1 point awarded all races) (* signifies that driver lead race for at least one lap – 1 point awarded all races)

Britcar 24 Hour results

References

External links

Official website
Profile from btccinfo.co.uk

1980 births
Living people
English racing drivers
British Touring Car Championship drivers
People from Lincolnshire
English female racing drivers
Britcar 24-hour drivers